White rice is milled rice that has had its husk, bran, and germ removed. This alters the flavor, texture and appearance of the rice and helps prevent spoilage, extend its storage life, and makes it easier to digest. After milling (hulling), the rice is polished, resulting in a seed with a bright, white, shiny appearance.

The milling and polishing processes both remove nutrients. An unbalanced diet based on unenriched white rice leaves many people vulnerable to the neurological disease beriberi, due to a deficiency of thiamine (vitamin B1). White rice is often enriched with some of the nutrients stripped from it during its processing.  Enrichment of white rice with B1, B3, and iron is required by law in the United States when distributed by government programs to schools, nonprofits, or foreign countries. As with all natural foods, the precise nutritional composition of rice varies slightly depending on the variety, soil conditions, environmental conditions and types of fertilizers.

Adopted over brown rice in the second half of the 19th century because it was favored by traders, white rice has led to a beriberi epidemic in Asia.

At various times, starting in the 19th century, brown rice and other grains such as wild rice have been advocated as healthier alternatives. The bran in brown rice contains significant dietary fiber and the germ contains many vitamins and minerals.

Typically, 100 grams of uncooked rice produces around 240 to 260 grams of cooked grains, the difference in weight being due to absorbed cooking water.

Milling rice

Before mechanical milling, rice was milled by a hand pounding technique with large mortar and pestle type devices. Some versions of this improved uniformity of the product, but with mechanical milling much larger quantities were able to be produced. In the late 19th century different machines were produced like the Huller & Sheller Mills (1870) and the Engelberg Milling Machine (1890). By 1955, new machinery had been developed in Japan that had significantly improved the quality and output capacity.

Nutritional content 

While brown rice and white rice have similar amounts of calories and carbohydrates, brown rice is a far richer source of all nutrients when compared to unenriched white rice. Brown rice is whole rice from which only the husk (the outermost layer) is removed. To produce white rice, the bran layer and the germ are removed, leaving mostly the starchy endosperm. This process causes the reduction or complete depletion of several vitamins and dietary minerals. Missing nutrients, such as vitamins B1 and B3, and iron, are sometimes added back into the white rice, a process called enrichment. Even with the reduction of nutrients, unenriched white rice is still a good source of manganese and contains moderate amounts of other nutrients such as pantothenic acid and selenium.

See also 

Parboiled rice
Rice husks
Rice mill
Rice huller
Rice polisher
Whole grain
Red rice
Maratelli

References

External links 

Rice dishes
Rice varieties

id:Beras